Charles Paul Efstration III (born April 24, 1983) is a Republican member of the Georgia House of Representatives from the 104th District, serving since 2013. In 2022, Efstration was elected Majority Leader.

Career 
In 2008, Efstration became an Assistant District Attorney of Gwinnett County Judicial Circuit, until 2013. In 2013, Efstration was an attorney at Efstration Law Firm, Professional Corporation, until 2018.

On November 5, 2013, Efstration and Teresa Cantrell were top candidates in the election and required a runoff. On December 3, 2013, Efstration won the special runoff election and became a Republican member of the Georgia House of Representatives for District 104. Efstration defeated Teresa Cantrell with 64.57% of the votes. On November 3, 2020, as an incumbent, Efstration won the election and continued serving District 104. Efstration defeated Nakita Hemingway with 51.15% of the votes. He previously ran for the United States House of Representatives in Georgia's 7th congressional district in 2010.

Efstration was a sponsor of a hate crimes law allowing for the imposition of extra penalties to criminals motivated by a victim's race, color, religion, national origin, sex, sexual orientation, gender or disability, which passed after the murder of Ahmaud Arbery.

In 2018, Efstration became an attorney at McGarity and Efstration.

Personal life 
Efstration's wife is Ashley Efstration. They have two children.

References

External links 
 Chuck Efstration at ballotpedia.org

1983 births
21st-century American politicians
Living people
Republican Party members of the Georgia House of Representatives